KRI Teluk Cirebon (543) is a Frosch II-class amphibious logistic ship operated the Indonesian Navy. The ship was former Nordperd (E 35 / E 171) of the Volksmarine.

Characteristics
KRI Teluk Cirebon is a Project 109 (NATO reporting name: Frosch II) amphibious logistic support ship.

The ship is powered by two diesel engines, with total power output of  distributed in two shaft.

The ship has  of cargo capacity and also equipped with a 5-tons crane in amidships.

As Nordperd, she was initially armed with two  twin 57 mm guns, two  twin 25 mm autocannons and equipped with Muff Cob fire control radar. As Teluk Cirebon, the ship are rearmed with two twin V-11 37 mm L/63 guns and two twin 2М-3 25 mm autocannons.

Service history
Nordperd was built by VEB Peenewerft, Wolgast. The ship was laid down on 26 January 1978, launched on 30 August 1978 and was commissioned to Volksmarine on 3 October 1979. Following the reunification of Germany, Nordperd was deleted on 1 October 1990 and was formally decommissioned from Volksmarine on 2 October. The unified German Navy didn't take over the ship and she was laid up at Peenemünde Naval Base. While being laid up, she received routine maintenance such as bilges inspection, heating in important areas, and routine propeller shaft inspection.

Indonesian Navy acquired the ship on 25 August 1993 as part of warship procurement program headed by the then State Minister for Research and Technology, B. J. Habibie, as the Coordinator of the Procurement Team. The procurement program was based on the Presidential Instruction No. 3/1992 issued by President Suharto on 3 September 1992 which aimed to bolster the Navy capabilities. Prior to sailing for Indonesia, she was refitted and demilitarized in Rostock. She was commissioned as KRI Teluk Cirebon (543) on 25 April 1995.

References

Bibliography

 

1978 ships
Frosch-class landing ships
Amphibious warfare vessels of the Indonesian Navy